The Tianjin University of Science and Technology is a municipal public university in Tianjin, China. Founded as Hebei Institute of Light Industry, the university gained university status in 2002 and is now sponsored by the Tianjin Municipal People's Government.

Founded in 1958, the school was named Hebei Institute of Light Industry. It was one of the first four light industry undergraduate colleges in the country and was affiliated to the Ministry of Light Industry of China. In 1959, following the State Council's higher education reorganization order, most faculty members and experimental equipment of the Pulp and Paper Department of Tianjin University were transferred to the school. In 1964, the fermentation engineering department of the Beijing Institute of Light Industry and the plastic molding and processing department of the Wuxi Institute of Light Industry were successively transferred to the school. In 1968, the school was renamed Tianjin Institute of Light Industry.

In 1971, the entire Pulp and Paper Department of Tianjin University was transferred to the school. In 1972, the Department of Salt Chemistry of the Beijing Institute of Light Industry and the Tanggu Salt Industry College of the Ministry of Light Industry merged and were placed under the school. In 1998, the school's management system was changed to a joint construction between the central government and the local government, with Tianjin as the main management. In 2002, with the approval of the Ministry of Education, the school was renamed Tianjin University of Science and Technology.

References

Universities and colleges in Tianjin
Technical universities and colleges in China